This is a list of United States Air Force special operations squadrons. It covers aerial units assigned to Air Force Special Operations Command in the United States Air Force.

Special Operations Squadrons

See also
 List of United States Air Force squadrons
 List of United States Air Force special tactics squadrons

References

Special operations